Jhon Arias (born 13 June 1969) is a Colombian cyclist. He competed in the men's cross-country mountain biking event at the 1996 Summer Olympics.

References

External links
 

1969 births
Living people
Colombian male cyclists
Olympic cyclists of Colombia
Cyclists at the 1996 Summer Olympics
Sportspeople from Antioquia Department